Ardross (Scottish Gaelic: Àird Rois, high-point of [Easter] Ross) is a rural area in the Highland region of Scotland,  north of the nearest city, Inverness.

The area is populated by a small rural community mainly confined to the more fertile lower slopes to the east and the glacial glens of Strathrusdale and Strathy (Ardross). The largest concentration of dwellings are in the village of Dublin comprising about 30 houses and a church, so named as it was founded by Irish immigrant workers who built Ardross Castle.

History 
The earliest inhabitants of Ardross were the Picts (6-10th century), and there are still recognisable remains of Pictish roundhouses at various locations in the area. The most notable surviving artefacts of their time in Ardross are two carved stone slabs depicting a wolf and a deer, some of the finest surviving Pictish animal symbols ever discovered, which are now displayed at Inverness Museum. The carvings were recovered from a drystone wall in Stittenham, Ardross in 1891. After the 10th century, habitation of the area became progressively more influenced by the Norse.

The Duke of Sutherland bought the  Ardross Estate in the late 18th century, and in 1845, sold it to Sir Alexander Matheson, 1st Baronet for £90,000.

Matheson improved the estate and placed it under the supervision of factor William MacKenzie, an engineer by profession. The architect Alexander Ross was commissioned to re-design Ardross Castle in the Scots Baronial style and following Sir Alexander's death, his son, Sir Kenneth Matheson, sold the estate in 1898 to Charles William Dyson Perrins, a Captain in the Highland Light Infantry, with interests in the Worcester Royal Porcelain Company and Lea & Perrins (Worcester) sauce. The estate was broken up and sold in 1937. The castle is now used as a wedding and conference venue. 

In 2022, the castle was used as filming location for BBC One reality television series The Traitors, and for the subsequent American series.

Famous people from Ardross include Sir John McKenzie, who emigrated to New Zealand and became a prominent politician. He is remembered in New Zealand as the Minister of Lands and Agriculture who developed a policy which disfavored large landowners. This stemmed from his experience in Ardross where he was deeply moved by the misery he witnessed among tenants on Ardross Estate. Some of his near relatives suffered in this way and were forced to emigrate to Canada and the United States. Many years later McKenzie related how, when once walking home with his father, he came upon a number of dispossessed tenant farmers who had been forced to camp in the local cemetery at Ardross Church as there was nowhere else to go. Many years earlier, in 1792 tenants at Strathrusdale, which forms the western area of Ardross, led a famous revolt against landowner's such as the Duke of Sutherland who were pursuing a policy of clearing land.

Local area 
The community has its own primary school with a roll of about 35 pupils and a recently built well-founded village hall for hosting local community activities and social events. Other local services can be found in the nearby town of Alness. Most inhabitants of the area today are employed in the North Sea oil industry, forestry, agriculture or the provision of local services.

References

External links 

 Community Website: Ardross.net
 Ardross Primary School
 Ardross Castle

Populated places in Ross and Cromarty
Inventory of Gardens and Designed Landscapes